Lavochne is a village (selo) in the Stryi Raion, in the Lviv Oblast (province) of Western Ukraine (prior to 1959, it was situated in the Drohobych Oblast). It belongs to the Slavske settlement hromada, one of the hromadas of Ukraine. The village has 1,198 inhabitants, and local government is through the Lavochnenska village council.

Geography 
The village is located on the Lviv-Chop railway line.
The Mukachevo-Svalyava-Lavochne railway line was constructed in 1881, and altered in 1887 to Lviv-Stryi-Chop. The Lavochne railway station building was opened in 1886. 

History 

The first written mention of the village refers to 1591, when it was a part of the Ruthenian voivodeship of the Rzeczpospolita. In the years 1772-1918, Lavochne was part of the Kingdom of Galicia and Lodomeria under Austrian rule. After the dissolution of Austria-Hungary, Lavochne became part of the Second Polish Republic, serving as the border railway station - first on the Polish-Chekhoslovakian border (until March 1939), and then on the Polish-Hungarian border. After the Invasion of Poland, Lavochne found itself in Soviet territory. From 1941 to 1944, Lavochne was part of Nazi Germany's District of Galicia. Lavochne was the last Ukrainian settlement liberated from Nazi occupation, on 8 October 1944. Since that time Lavochne is part of Ukraine (in Drohobych Oblast until 1959, since then in Lviv Oblast).
According to one telling, the village's name derives from wooden benches ( lavky) stacked in order to cross the river.

Until 18 July 2020, Lavochne belonged to the Skole Raion. That raion was abolished in July 2020 as part of an administrative reform in Ukraine, which reduced the number of raions of the Lviv Oblast to seven. The territory of the Skole Raion was merged into the Stryi Raion.

Religious structures 

The village used to contain an architectural monument (1415/1), the wooden church of St. Michael, dating to 1907. On July 10, 2012, the church was destroyed in a fire caused by a lightning strike. In its place, another church, also wooden, has been built.

Mentions in literature 
Lavochne is the hometown of the heroes of Mirjam Pressler's novel "Malka Mai".

References

External links 
 Населені пункти Сколівського району  -  Лавочне 
 village Lavochne
 weather.in.ua

Literature 
 Історія міст і сіл УРСР : Львівська область, Тершів. – К. : ГРУРЕ, 1968 р. Page 717 

Villages in Stryi Raion